The 2006 VMI Keydets football team represented the Virginia Military Institute during the 2006 NCAA Division I FCS football season. It was the Keydets' 116th year of football, and their 4th season in the Big South Conference.

Following the firing of former coach Cal McCombs, who headed the VMI football team from 1999 to 2005, the Keydets announced they hired Jim Reid as their new head coach on December 22, 2005. After winning the first game of the season over Davidson 20–19, VMI went winless through the rest of the year, dropping 10 straight games, including all four in conference play.

Schedule

Source: 2006 VMI Football Schedule

References

VMI
VMI Keydets football seasons
VMI Keydets football